The 1998–99 season was the 30th season of competitive association football in Australia.

National teams

Australia national soccer team

Results and fixtures

Friendlies

Men's football

National Soccer League

Source:

Women's football

Women's National Soccer League

Source:

References

1998 in Australian sport
1999 in Australian sport
Seasons in Australian soccer